Omaloplia is a genus of beetles belonging to the subfamily Melolonthidae.

The genus has cosmopolitan distribution.

Species:
 Omaloplia alternata Kuster, 1849 
 Omaloplia analis Guérin-Méneville, 1849

References

Scarabaeidae
Scarabaeidae genera